E=MC² is a 1979 studio album by Italian producer Giorgio Moroder. It has been billed as the "first electronic live-to-digital album." The album's title track peaked at number 4 on Billboards Dance Club Songs chart.

Critical reception

Alex Henderson of AllMusic gave the album 4 stars out of 5, saying, "This is the electronic dance music that preceded the rise of techno, house, and industrial noise, and it came at a time when hip-hop was in its infancy and the rave subculture had yet to be invented." He described it as "a historically interesting LP that anyone who has enjoyed electronic dance rhythms needs to check out." Kyle Fowle of The A.V. Club wrote, "The title track includes some of Moroder's finest vocoder work while songs like 'I Wanna Rock You' and 'Baby Blue' see Moroder delivering some of his most polished disco efforts, removed from the rawness of those Donna Summer tracks but still very indebted to them."

Track listing

Charts

Personnel
Credits adapted from liner notes.

 Giorgio Moroder – production
 Harold Faltermeyer – production, engineer, mixing, programming
Keith Forsey - drums, percussion
 Jules Bloomenthal – computerized digital editing
 Bruce Rothaar – computerized digital editing
 Brian Gardner – mastering
 Henry Vizcarra – artwork
 Glenn Parsons – artwork
 Ron Slenzak – photography
 David Ingebretsen – computer photography
 Shusei Nagaoka – illustration

References

External links
 
 

1979 albums
Giorgio Moroder albums
Albums produced by Giorgio Moroder
Albums produced by Harold Faltermeyer
Casablanca Records albums